The National Capital Region, also referred to as Canada's Capital Region and Ottawa–Gatineau (formerly Ottawa–Hull), is an official federal designation for the Canadian capital of Ottawa, Ontario, the neighbouring city of Gatineau, Quebec, and surrounding suburban and exurban communities. The term National Capital Region is often used to describe the Ottawa–Gatineau metropolitan area, although the official boundaries of the NCR do not correspond to the statistical metropolitan area.

Unlike capital districts in some other federal countries, such as the District of Columbia in the United States, the National Capital Territory of Delhi in India or the Australian Capital Territory in Australia, the National Capital Region is not a separate political or administrative entity. Its component parts are within the provinces of Ontario and Quebec.

Defined by the National Capital Act (1985), the National Capital Region consists of an area of  that straddles the Ottawa River, which serves as the boundary between the provinces of Ontario and Quebec. Ottawa–Gatineau is the only CMA in the nation to fall within two provinces.

History 

The Algonquins are indigenous to Ottawa-Gatineau.  The first European settlement in the region was led by Philemon Wright, a New Englander from Woburn, Massachusetts who, on March 7, 1800, arrived with his own and five other families along with twenty-five labourers to start an agricultural community on the north bank of the Ottawa River (Hull, Quebec) at the portage to the Chaudière Falls.

The NCR was first specified by the National Capital Act (1985).

Geography 

Ottawa is located in the sub-region of Southern Ontario called Eastern Ontario. Gatineau is located in southwestern Quebec. Although overall Ontario is west of Quebec, the boundary in this region is situated in such a way that Gatineau is north of Ottawa, and northwest of the city centre.

The National Capital Region is situated close to where the Canadian shield and the Saint Lawrence Lowlands intersect. The area has several major fault lines and small earthquakes do occur somewhat regularly, including the 2010 Central Canada earthquake that occurred in Quebec. The Gatineau Hills are the foothills of the Laurentian Mountains and located in the region.

Climate 
The National Capital Region experiences a humid continental climate (Köppen Dfb), with four distinct seasons and is between Zones 5a and 5b on the Canadian Plant Hardiness Scale. In Ottawa, the average July maximum temperature is 26.6 °C (80 °F). The average January minimum temperature is −14.4 °C (6.1 °F). In Gatineau, the average July maximum is 26 °C (78.8 °F) while the average January minimum temperature is −15 °C (5 °F).

National Capital Commission 
The National Capital Commission (NCC) is a corporation that was established by the federal government in 1959 to oversee federal buildings and land in the federally designated National Capital Region (NCR). Although the NCR is not a separate political jurisdiction, the NCC has a mandate and mission to build the NCR into a source of pride and unity for Canadians through involvement in political, cultural, and land use planning matters that are typically powers reserved for the provincial government under the Constitution of Canada. In the Supreme Court of Canada case of Munro v. National Capital Commission, it was decided the NCC had the power to be involved in matters relating to zoning in the NCR.

In 2006, the NCC completed work on the long-discussed Confederation Boulevard, a ceremonial route linking key attractions in the NCR on both sides of the Ottawa River.

The NCC reports to Parliament through the Minister of Heritage, and is governed by the National Capital Act. Its headquarters are in the Chambers Building on Elgin Street, between Queen and Sparks Streets.

Attractions 

The NCR has numerous attractions, including world-famous festivals, national museums, famous buildings and architecture, sports, and entertainment. Ottawa has some of the best examples of Gothic Revival architecture in North America.

Festivals 
These include the annual music festival Bluesfest, the world-renowned winter festival Winterlude, the Canadian Tulip Festival, Capital Pride, RCMP musical ride, Gatineau Hot Air Balloon Festival, Buskers festival, and the biggest Canada Day celebrations in the nation.

Built heritage 
Ottawa and Gatineau have a number of national museums. The most prominent museums are the Canadian Museum of History, Canadian War Museum, Canadian Museum of Nature, Canada Science and Technology Museum, National Art Gallery, and Canada Aviation Museum. Some of the region's most famous buildings are the Parliament Hill, the Prime Minister's home 24 Sussex Drive, the Governor General's home Rideau Hall, the Canadian Museum of History, the National Gallery of Canada, the Supreme Court of Canada, the Royal Canadian Mint, the American Embassy, and the National Library.

There are 29 National Historic Sites of Canada within the National Capital Region: 25 sites are located in Ottawa, with the Former Almonte Post Office and Rosamond Woollen Mill in Almonte, the Gillies Grove and House in Arnprior, the Manoir Papineau in Montebello and the Symmes Hotel in the Aylmer sector of Gatineau.

Sports and entertainment 
The National Capital Region has many sports teams. The Ottawa Senators of the National Hockey League play in the City of Ottawa's western suburb  of Kanata. The Ottawa Redblacks are members of the Canadian Football League. Atlético Ottawa play in soccer's Canadian Premier League. Ottawa is also home to the Ontario Hockey League club, the Ottawa 67's. Gatineau is home to the 2007-2008 QMJHL, Gatineau Olympiques.

The Ottawa area has three universities, two of which, Carleton University and the University of Ottawa, compete in U Sports. The Carleton Ravens are regularly ranked No. 1 in men's basketball, and the Ottawa Gee-Gees are nationally ranked in football and basketball. Algonquin College has also won numerous national championships.

Silicon Valley North
During the decade of the 1990-2000, Ottawa was home to several very successful tech companies, including Nortel Networks, JDS Uniphase, and Newbridge Networks. High-tech employment doubled in five years to reach 80,000 by 2001. With Nortel failing to meet high earnings expectations and layoffs starting in 2002 in the wake of the dot-com bubble, the company started to decline, a devastating shock to the tech industry in Ottawa. Others described it as an 'anchor' for the industry in Ottawa, and an 'incubator' and that without it the Ottawa high-tech industry could not sustain itself. By the mid 2000, other Canadian regions were competing for the title of Silicon Valley North. The term was being adopted to refer to the area between Toronto and Kitchener-Waterloo, which is home to Research in Motion (BlackBerry), and offices for Google, Adobe Inc., and Microsoft. With companies such as Shopify, Halogen Software, and Kinaxis Inc, all headquartered in Ottawa, as well as over 1,700 other technology companies, Ottawa still has a significant high-tech presence today.

Transportation 

The NCR has several major freeways including the 417, 416, 5, 50, 174, and 7.

The 417 is Ottawa's major east-west commuter expressway. It begins at the Ontario-Quebec border (continuing the route of Quebec Autoroute 40), reaches the urban portion of Ottawa at the 417-174 split, bisects the urban area, and continues westward to just beyond the city boundary where it gives way to Highway 17 in Renfrew County.

The 416 starts at the 401 near the Ogdensburg-Prescott International Bridge and continues north for 75 km until it ends at the 417 in Ottawa's west end.

The freeway section of Highway 7 branches off the 417 in Ottawa's west end near Stittsville and is currently undergoing a 4-lane expansion to reach the eastern fringe of Carleton Place at McNeely Avenue.  As of July 2011, the expansion was complete through to Ashton Station Road.

Public transportation is handled by OC Transpo on the Ontario side, and the STO on the Quebec side. Together they serve a population over 1,130,761 and have an estimated annual ridership of over 113.2 million.

OC Transpo operates a light rail transit (LRT) system named the O-Train with two lines in operation. The O-Train Trillium Line is a north-south line using diesel-powered units and has just over 2 million riders per year. The Confederation Line links the western suburbs and the eastern suburbs via downtown, and uses electrically powered light-rail vehicles. The Confederation Line is currently 12.5 km long with 13 stations, 3 of which are underground in downtown Ottawa. There is a proposed LRT system in Gatineau that would connect with the Confederation and Trillium Lines in Ottawa.

Gatineau built a bus transitway, the Rapibus, which started operation in October 2013.

OC Transpo has about 1,050 buses which run on city streets and an expansive Transitway. The STO has around 300 buses that serve the Quebec side of the Ottawa River, some routes crossing into downtown Ottawa.

Ottawa Macdonald–Cartier International Airport is the main international airport serving the Capital Region. It handled over 4.2 million passengers in 2009, making it Canada's 6th busiest air facility and the 2nd busiest airport in Ontario. It offers non-stop flights to and from destinations in Canada, the United States, Caribbean and Europe. It is part of the three busiest air routes in the nation, with hourly flights to/from Montreal-Pierre Elliott Trudeau International Airport and Toronto Pearson International Airport.

Area codes 
The NCR uses area codes 613 and 343 on the Ontario side of the Ottawa River, while on the Quebec side 819 and 873 are used.

Although each region has different area codes, the pre-merger territories of Ottawa and Hull are a single local calling area. Previously, Ottawa and Hull also had exchange protection in place to preserve seven-digit dialling between the two cities, implemented in such a way that if a number was in use in Ottawa the equivalent 819 number could not be assigned anywhere in western Quebec. Similarly, the 613 equivalent of a number used in Hull could not be assigned anywhere in eastern Ontario.  This is no longer the case, as ten-digit local dialling has been in place since 2006. The sole legacy of the old system is a "dual dialability" system for federal government numbers on both sides of the provincial border; all federal government offices on the Quebec side duplicated several exchanges worth of their counterparts on the Ontario side.

Media 

There are three main daily local newspapers printed in Ottawa: two English newspapers, the Ottawa Citizen and the Ottawa Sun, with 550,777 and 238,584 weekly circulation respectively, and one French newspaper, Le Droit with 204,947 weekly circulation.

Demographics 
Most of the National Capital Region is recognized as a bilingual region for federal language-of-work purposes.

In addition, the City of Ottawa has a bilingualism policy, but is not declared "officially bilingual" (which would require amendments to the provincial law). About 19% of the population of the City of Ottawa has French as their first language, while 40% of the total population of the city declares itself fluent in both languages.

The National Capital Region includes the English-speaking (Ottawa) and French-speaking (Gatineau) cores.  The metro region has a bilingual population of 496,025, an English-only population of 507,175, and a French-only population of 102,375.

Capital district proposals 
Proposals have sometimes been made to separate the National Capital Region from its two respective provinces, and transform it into a separate capital district, like the District of Columbia in the United States or the Australian Capital Territory; however, the proposal has never come close to fruition and there is no such movement currently active. The proposal historically tended to be more common when the sovereigntist Parti Québécois held power in Quebec, owing in part to the Hull/Gatineau area's more strongly federalist orientation, but any prospect of the federal government ever supporting the proposal virtually disappeared following the 1995 Quebec referendum, which would have been narrowly won by the Yes side if the solidly federalist vote in the Hull/Gatineau region had been excluded.

See also 

 List of diplomatic missions in Ottawa
 Eastern Ontario
 Outaouais
 Southern Ontario

References

Further reading

External links 

 National Capital Commission – Commission de la capitale nationale
 Canadian War Museum
 Canadian Museum of Civilization

 
Metropolitan areas of Ontario
Metropolitan areas of Quebec
Geographic regions of Ontario
Geographic regions of Quebec